Liviu Dan Puric (born February 12, 1959) is a Romanian actor, director, pantomime artist and political activist.

Biography
He graduated in 1978 from the fine arts high school Nicolae Tonitza in Bucharest, and in 1985 from the Institute of Theatrical and Cinematographic Arts, Bucharest. Between 1985 and 1988, he was an actor at the Botoşani Theater. Nowadays, he is an actor at the National Theatre Bucharest. His shows - Toujours l'amour, Made in Romania, Costumele (The Costumes), Don Quijote - have been played in many countries. He played the main role in Broken Youth. He also played in films for the public television in Lausanne, Switzerland.

In 2000, Dan Puric received the Order of the Star of Romania with the Knight rank, for "exceptional services in culture".

Honours
  Romanian Royal Family: 39th Knight of the Royal Decoration of the Cross of the Romanian Royal House

Books
 Cine suntem (2008)
 Despre omul frumos (2009)
 Fii Demn! (2011)
 Suflet românesc (2013)
 Dulci - Jurnalul unui câine scris de un puric Dan (2015)
 Să fii român! (2016)

References

1959 births
Romanian mimes
Romanian male actors
Romanian theatre directors
Far-right politics in Romania
Members of the Romanian Orthodox Church
People from Buzău
Living people
Romanian conspiracy theorists